Delhi Public School (DPS), Varanasi is a private co-educational school belonging to the Delhi Public School Society in Varanasi, Uttar Pradesh, India. Affiliated to the Central Board of Secondary Education (CBSE), DPS Varanasi commenced with its first academic session on 7 April 2003. In 2019, the school completed 10 years of its functioning. DPS Varanasi has been performing well on the academic front too with almost 40 students belonging to the current 2013 Class X batch scoring a perfect 10 CGPA in the CBSE board exams.

History
DPS Varanasi is the 17th DPS branch in Uttar Pradesh and the 100th among all its branches in India and abroad, the first being the Delhi Public School at Mathura Road which was established in 1949 in New Delhi. Mr. Narendra Kumar, former chairman of the Delhi Public School Society officially flagged off the Varanasi branch in October 2002, with the academic session commencing in April 2003. Initially, classes from LKG to VI were begun but later on, middle as well as secondary levels were also added to the school. The first principal of DPS Varanasi was Mr. S Sharma, who earlier worked at DPS, RK Puram.

Campus
The DPS Varanasi campus is located on Mohansarai Bypass Road on National Highway 2 and spans over 8 acres (32,000 square metres). Besides an adequate number of classrooms, the school building also comprises individual Physics, Chemistry, Biology, Maths and Computer laboratories. A sports complex with indoor game facilities like chess, badminton and table tennis complete with trained instructors is also a part of the school campus, including a swimming pool. Also, DPS Varanasi is a member of VSAT linked Edu-Link initiative of the DPS Society through which students can attend online classes and learn from teachers belonging to the All India DPS Fraternity. The current principal of DPS Varanasi is Mukesh Shelat.

External links

References

Delhi Public School Society
Primary schools in Uttar Pradesh
High schools and secondary schools in Uttar Pradesh
Schools in Varanasi
Educational institutions established in 2003
2003 establishments in Uttar Pradesh